Chaetostoma lepturum is a species of catfish in the family Loricariidae. It is native to South America, where it occurs in the San Juan River basin in Colombia. The species reaches 21.5 cm (8.5 inches) SL.

References 

lepturum

Fish of Colombia
Fish described in 1912
Catfish of South America